Robert G. Helm (born 1949) is a Republican politician who was elected and currently serves in the Vermont House of Representatives. He represents the Rutland-3 Representative District.

References

Living people
Republican Party members of the Vermont House of Representatives
1949 births
21st-century American politicians